William Hollingsworth Attwood (July 14, 1919 – April 15, 1989) was an American journalist, author, editor and diplomat.

Life

Early life
Born in Paris, France, he received his education at Choate Rosemary Hall and Princeton University, editing The Daily Princetonian and later serving as a Princeton trustee.

He served as a paratrooper in World War II. After the war, Attwood wrote for the New York Herald Tribune and soon was transferred to the Paris bureau of the international edition.  His first book, The Man Who Could Grow Hair, or Inside Andorra, was a memoir-based series of tales of his adventures in post-war Europe.

Attwood married Simone Cadgene in Paris in 1950 and the couple eventually had three children, Peter, Janet, and Susan.  He published a memoir of their impressions of the changes in America upon returning, titled Still the Most Exciting Country.

Speechwriting
Adlai Stevenson enlisted Attwood to serve as a speechwriter and advisor in both of his presidential campaigns, in 1952 and 1956, and to write other speeches in 1960.  When John F. Kennedy became the 1960 Democratic nominee, Attwood joined the Kennedy campaign.  Stevenson and Attwood were close friends and collaborators for years.  Attwood accompanied Stevenson on a trip around the world sponsored by Look magazine, writing the regular articles about Stevenson's travels that appeared in that magazine.

Diplomat
Early in his presidency, President Kennedy appointed Attwood to serve as Ambassador to the West African country of Guinea.  He was forced to return to the States after a near fatal case of polio (which gave him a permanent limp), but recovered and returned to Guinea for a time. In 1963, the Kennedy administration desired to negotiate détente with Fidel Castro and to negotiate the beginning of normalized relations after the 1964 campaign.  Attwood claimed he served as a secret liaison and was due to report to the president when Kennedy returned from the trip to Dallas during which he was assassinated; and that the Johnson administration discontinued this effort. Attwood served a second appointment as ambassador during the Johnson administration, to Kenya.  He published a book about the relationship of Kenyan politics and communism, The Reds and the Blacks.

Later life
Attwood had long worked with Cowles Communications, mostly in various editorial roles at Look.  In 1970, he became editor of Newsday, the Long Island daily newspaper. He started Newsday's New York edition.

Upon retirement in 1979, Attwood focused on writing, and serving the Town Council in his hometown of New Canaan, Connecticut.  After covering the Geneva Summit between Reagan and Gorbachev in 1987, Attwood published his final book, The Twilight Struggle: Tales of the Cold War, which chronicled his unique view of the Cold War from its beginning to its presumable end.

Attwood died from congestive heart failure in New Canaan on April 15, 1989.

Memory
The Public Library in Attwood's hometown of New Canaan annually hosts the Attwood Memorial Lecture, which features speakers who reflect his own passions for the intersection of journalism and politics.  Speakers have included Art Buchwald, Doris Kearns Goodwin, and Jonathan Alter.

Attwood's papers are held by the State Historical Society of Wisconsin.

Books by Attwood

The Man Who Could Grow Hair Alfred A. Knopf, 1949.
Still the Most Exciting Country Alfred A Knopf, 1955.
The Decline of the American Male (contributor to essay collection with other Look editors) Random House, 1958.
The Reds and the Blacks Harper & Row, 1967.
The Fairly Scary Adventure Book (children's book) HarperCollins, 1969.
Making It Through Middle Age Atheneum Books, 1982.
The Twilight Struggle: Tales of the Cold War HarperCollins, 1987.

References

External links
The Political Graveyard
The New York Times, Obituary for William Attwood

1919 births
1989 deaths
Ambassadors of the United States to Guinea
Ambassadors of the United States to Kenya
Princeton University alumni
20th-century American writers
20th-century American male writers
Paratroopers
Choate Rosemary Hall alumni
20th-century American diplomats
American editors
20th-century American journalists
American male journalists
Democratic Party (United States) politicians
United States Army personnel of World War II
American expatriates in France